The Uncompahgre Formation is a geologic formation in Colorado. Its radiometric age is between 1707 and 1704 Ma, corresponding to the Statherian period.

History 
The formation was first named by Charles Whitman Cross and Ernest Howe in 1905 for exposures around Uncompahgre Gorge near Ouray, Colorado. They grouped it with the Vallecito Conglomerate into the Needle Mountains Group, but this was abandoned by Tweto in 1977. Karl Karlstrom and coinvestigators informally raised the Uncompahgre Formation to group rank in 2017, assigning the Vallecito Conglomerate as a member.

Geology 
It is exposed in a curving belt from the northwestern to northeastern Needle Mountains with outliers near Ouray and Rico, Colorado. It is interpreted as metamorphosed marine and fluvial sandstone, mudstone, and shale.

The formation overlies plutons with an age of 1707 Ma and detrital zircon geochronology confirms a maximum age of 1709 Ma. Ar40Ar/39Ar dating of muscovite in an intruding dike gives a minimum age of 1704 Ma, allowing the age of the Uncompahgre Formation to be tightly constrained. Dating of contact metamorphism aureoles show the formation was deformed by metamorphosis at around 1460 to 1400 Ma, concurrent with the Picuris orogeny. The formation is thought to be correlative with the Ortega Formation in northern New Mexico and the Mazatzal Group in Arizona.

Footnotes

References 
 
 
 
 
 

Mesoproterozoic geology of Colorado